Yuli Township (Japanese: Tamazato [ Kanji:  [] ]), Bunun:  (Hanzi transliterated by 1917), is an urban township located in central Huadong Valley, and also the southern administrative center of Hualien County, Taiwan. It has a population of 22,356 inhabitants and 15 villages.

Geography

The township is located in the Huadong Valley.

Administrative divisions
The township comprises 15 villages: Chunri, Dayu, Dewu, Guanyin, Guowu, Lege, Qimo, Sanmin, Songpu, Taichang, Tungfeng, Yongchang, Yuancheng, Zhangliang, and Zhongcheng.

Tourist attractions

 Antong Hot Springs
 Dongfeng Leisure Farm
 Mount Chihke
 Teifen Waterfalls
 Xietian Temple
 Yucyuan Temple
 Yuli Jinja
 Walami Trail
 Yushan National Park

Transportation

Railway
TRA (Taitung line)
Yuli Station
Sanmin Station

Road
 Provincial Highway 9 (Hualien-Taitung Highway)
 Provincial Highway 30 (Yuli-Chengbin Highway)
 County Road No.193

Bus
 Hualien Bus Company

Notable natives
 Evonne Hsieh, actress
 Umin Boya, writer, director and actor
 Wu Maw-kuen, Minister of Education (2018)

References

External links 

 Office of Yu Li Township (Chinese)

Townships in Hualien County